Kilmichael GAA is a Gaelic football and hurling club based in the village of Kilmichael in County Cork, Ireland. The club participates in Cork GAA competitions and in Muskerry board competitions.

Achievements
 Cork Junior B Hurling Championship Winners (1) 2011
 Mid Cork Junior A Football Championship Winners (6) 1953, 1956, 1959, 1960, 1963, 1987, 2013 Runners-Up 1996
 Mid Cork Junior 'B' Football Championship Winners (1) 2006
 Mid Cork Under-21B Football Championship Winners (1) 2003
 Mid Cork Junior 'A' Hurling Championship Runners-Up 2014, 2017
 Cork Minor C Football Championship Winners (1) 2010
 County Minor C Football League Winners (1) 2003

Notable players
 Peter Kelleher(Cork Senior Football and minor Hurling) (Cork U21 Football)

References

External sources
 List of Cork Senior Football Champions 
 List of Cork Intermediate Football Champions
 Hogan Stand list of Cork Champions
 Cork GAA results archive page
 Kilmichael club website

Gaelic games clubs in County Cork
Hurling clubs in County Cork
Gaelic football clubs in County Cork